Wu Shan-chen is a Taiwanese taekwondo practitioner. She won a bronze medal in finweight at the 1991 World Taekwondo Championships, and a bronze medal in bantamweight at the 1995 World Taekwondo Championships. She won a gold medal at the 1989 World Games, and a gold medal at the 1990 Asian Taekwondo Championships.

References

External links
 

Year of birth missing (living people)
Living people
Taiwanese female taekwondo practitioners
World Games medalists in taekwondo
World Games gold medalists
Competitors at the 1989 World Games
World Taekwondo Championships medalists
Asian Taekwondo Championships medalists
20th-century Taiwanese women